Young Allies, in comics, may refer to one of the following superhero teams:
 Young Allies (DC Comics), a team made up of young heroes from the Allies and featured in a story arc in Young All-Stars published by DC Comics.
 Young Allies (Marvel Comics), several super hero teams in stories published by Timely/Marvel Comics.